Hockey at the 1976 Olympics may refer to:

Ice hockey at the 1976 Winter Olympics
Field hockey at the 1976 Summer Olympics